Gerald Green (born 1986) is an American former basketball player and player development coach.

Gerald Green may also refer to:

Gerald Green (author) (1922–2006), American author, journalist, producer, and director
Gerald Green (film producer) (1932–2015)
Gerald Green (politician) (born 1939), American politician in the New Jersey General Assembly

See also
Gerard Greene (born 1973), snooker player
Jerry Green (disambiguation)